is a Japanese professional tennis player.

Biography
Malhotra was born in Gifu, Japan to a Japanese mother and an Indian father. Her paternal grandmother was from Greece and her paternal grandfather was from India. She moved to the United Kingdom when she was 3 and stayed in the country for 8 years.

Coached by her father (and former pro tennis player), she made her professional debut in October 2005. She became part of the Yonex advisory staff in 2009.

She was the team member of TC Blau-Weiss (Germany) in 2010, before getting injured in an exhibition match in Germany in November 2010.

She has done part-time commercial modeling and starred in numerous TV shows in Japan whilst being managed by Horipro Talent Agency.

She also became part of the organization "UYOI" (United Youth of India) in 2009.

References

Living people
1989 births
Japanese female tennis players
People from Gifu
Sportspeople from Gifu Prefecture
Japanese people of Indian descent
20th-century Japanese women
21st-century Japanese women